A vicarage is a type of clergy house. 
The Vicarage may refer to:

In England
 The Vicarage, Congresbury
 Embleton Vicarage
 Halton Vicarage
 Holy Cross Inns Court Vicarage

In the United States
 The Vicarage (DeFuniak Springs, Florida)

See also
 Murder at the Vicarage (play), play by Moie Charles and Barbara Toy based on the 1930 novel of the same name by Agatha Christie
 The Murder at the Vicarage, a work of detective fiction by Agatha Christie
 Old Vicarage (disambiguation)